Mount Stroschein is a mountain in Antarctica, 1,020 m, standing 2 nautical miles (3.7 km) southwest of Weber Ridge in the Anderson Hills in northern Patuxent Range, Pensacola Mountains. It was mapped by the United States Geological Survey (USGS) from surveys and U.S. Navy air photos from 1956 to 1966. It was named by US-ACN for Leander A. Stroschein, a meteorologist at Plateau Station in 1965–66 and 1966–67.

Mountains of Queen Elizabeth Land
Pensacola Mountains